Distipsidera is a genus of beetles in the family Cicindelidae, containing the following species:

 Distipsidera eungellae McCairns, Freitag & McDonald, 1997
 Distipsidera flavicans (Chaudoir, 1854)
 Distipsidera flavipes Macleay, 1887
 Distipsidera grutii Pascoe, 1862
 Distipsidera hackeri Sloane, 1906
 Distipsidera mastersii Macleay, 1871
 Distipsidera obscura Sloane, 1909
 Distipsidera papuana Gestro, 1879
 Distipsidera parva Macleay, 1887
 Distipsidera sericea Mjuberg, 1916
 Distipsidera undulata Westwood, 1837
 Distipsidera volitans Macleay, 1863

References

Cicindelidae